Ametropus ammophilus is a species of sand minnow in the family Ametropodidae. It is found in southwestern Canada and the northwestern United States.

References

Mayflies
Articles created by Qbugbot
Insects described in 1976
Insects of Canada
Insects of the United States